Hong Taechawanit, born Zheng Yifeng (18515 March 1937) and also known as Zheng Zhiyong or Er Ger Feng (lit. 'Second Brother Feng', rendered in Thai from Teochew as ), was a Chinese businessman, philanthropist, and secret society member who was active in early twentieth-century Siam.

Early life
Zheng Yifeng was born in 1851 in Qiyuan Village, Chaozhou, Guangdong. His father, Zheng Shisheng, was a peasant who fled China during the First Opium War but died en route to Thailand. His mother subsequently remarried and Zheng Yifeng himself moved to Thailand, settling down in Bangkok.

Career
While working for gambling magnate Liu Jibin, Zheng became a member of the clandestine Chinatown-based 'Tian Di Hui' or 'Heaven and Earth Society'. Zheng would become commonly referred to as 'Er Ge Feng' or 'Second Brother Feng', because of his becoming the secret society's second-highest authority; he eventually became its leader after the death of his predecessor.

Zheng successfully petitioned for King Chulalongkorn to grant him tax farming rights over gambling houses. In 1909, he dissented from the popular Chinese sentiment against the king's most recent tax reforms and refused to partake in a three-day-long strike action. In June 1918, Zheng was granted the surname Taechawanit (Tejavanija) and conferred the title of Phra Anuwatratchaniyom by King Vajiravudh. Hong Taechawanit began to build a conglomerate in Thailand, which comprised pawnshops, a printing press, a shipping line, a theatre, and the biggest gambling house in the country. His mansion in Phlapphla Chai also served as his company headquarters. 

In addition to being a founder of schools in both Thailand and China, Hong Taechawanit bankrolled newspapers and charities. He made significant donations to his hometown in Guangdong, such as in 1918 when he gave 380,000 silver dollars to flood relief efforts.

Final years and legacy
Hong sympathised with the Kuomintang led by Sun Yat Sen; following the collapse of the imperial government in 1911, he gifted Sun with an unspecified amount of ivory. Following a series of financial setbacks, most notably the loss of his tax farming license, Hong died on 5 March 1937, aged 84. Taechawanit Road, whose construction he financed, is now named after him. His mansion was donated to the state and became the present-day Phlapphachai Police Station. Because of his stature as a 'gambling lord', Hong was deified as a 'luck-bringer' after his death and is popularly worshipped by Thai gamblers.

References

Notes

Citations

Bibliography

 
 
 
 
 
 

1851 births
1937 deaths
20th-century Chinese businesspeople
Businesspeople from Guangdong
Hong Taechawanit
Chinese philanthropists
People from Chaozhou
Hong Taechawanit
Hong Taechawanit